The Slide Lake-Otatso Creek Patrol Cabin and Woodshed in Glacier National Park are a small group of rustic buildings in the park's backcountry. Built in 1936, the patrol cabin is a frame building, unlike the more typical log patrol cabins found throughout the park. The similar woodshed is nearby. The cabin's proximity to the Alpine-themed Many Glacier Hotel may have influenced the decorative detailing, which is unique in Glacier. The only other frame patrol cabin is the Fielding Cabin, in the southern part of the park. The cabin was completely reconstructed in the 1980s "to thwart a particularly aggressive pack rat population".

References

Ranger stations in Glacier National Park (U.S.)
Park buildings and structures on the National Register of Historic Places in Montana
Log cabins in the United States
Government buildings completed in 1936
Rustic architecture in Montana
National Register of Historic Places in Glacier County, Montana
Log buildings and structures on the National Register of Historic Places in Montana
1936 establishments in Montana
National Register of Historic Places in Glacier National Park